Goldebek (North Frisian: Golbäk) is a municipality in the district of Nordfriesland, in Schleswig-Holstein, Germany.

References

Nordfriesland